Seán Carrabine is a Gaelic footballer who plays for Castleconnor and at senior level for the Sligo county team.

A midfielder, he scored a goal away to New York in the 2022 Connacht Senior Football Championship; Sligo won the game by four points, with Carrabine's goal worth three. He helped Sligo past Leitrim and into Croke Park in the 2022 Tailteann Cup and was named on the Team of the Week afterwards. In October, he was named on the Tailteann Cup Team of the Year; teammates Evan Lyons and Aidan Devaney were also included, giving Sligo three out of the total of fifteen positions.

Honours
Individual
 Tailteann Cup Team of the Year (1): 2022

References

Year of birth missing (living people)
Living people
Castleconnor Gaelic footballers
Sligo inter-county Gaelic footballers